The 2018–19 Hertha BSC season was the 127th season in the football club's history and 6th consecutive and 36th overall season in the top flight of German football, the Bundesliga, having been promoted from the 2. Bundesliga in 2013. In addition to the domestic league, Hertha BSC also participated in this season's editions of the domestic cup, the DFB-Pokal. This was the 51st season for Hertha in the Olympiastadion Berlin, located in Berlin, Germany. The season covered a period from 1 July 2018 to 30 June 2019.

Players

Squad information

Friendly matches

Competitions

Overview

Bundesliga

League table

Results summary

Results by round

Matches

DFB-Pokal

Statistics

Appearances and goals

|-
! colspan=14 style=background:#dcdcdc; text-align:center| Goalkeepers

|-
! colspan=14 style=background:#dcdcdc; text-align:center| Defenders

|-
! colspan=14 style=background:#dcdcdc; text-align:center| Midfielders

|-
! colspan=14 style=background:#dcdcdc; text-align:center| Forwards

|-
! colspan=14 style=background:#dcdcdc; text-align:center| Players transferred out during the season

|-

References

Hertha BSC seasons
Berlin, Hertha